Megachile canescens is a species of bee in the family Megachilidae. It was described by Brullé in 1832.

References

External links

Canescens
Insects described in 1832
Taxa named by Gaspard Auguste Brullé